William Lovell Finley (August 9, 1876 - June 29, 1953) was an American wildlife photographer and conservationist from Northern California. The William L. Finley National Wildlife Refuge was named in his honor.

Family
He was born on August 9, 1876 in Santa Clara, California to John Pettus Finley and Nancy Catherine Rucker. Finley's parents went west by covered wagon in 1852 from Saline County, Missouri to Santa Clara, California when they were just small children. Finley's middle name, Lovell, was the name of another of the families that went west with the Finleys and Ruckers. Finley's great grandfather was Asa Finley, the first elected judge of Arrow Rock in Saline County, and his uncle was William Asa Finley, the first president of Oregon State University (then named Corvallis College).

Finley married, and he and his wife Irene traveled together on expeditions in the Bering Sea, the Gulf of Mexico, and mountainous parts of North America. They had two children, a son and a daughter.

Career
In 1905, Finley and Herman T. Bohlman visited and photographed Lower Klamath Lake and Tule Lake. Their report in the November–December issue of Bird Lore helped prompt President Theodore Roosevelt to set the areas aside as federal bird reservations. The same year, Finley was elected to the board of the National Association of Audubon Societies for the Protection of Wild Birds and Animals (which later became the National Audubon Society), to fill the term vacated by Isaac N. Field.

In 1906, Finley was elected the second president of the Oregon Audubon Society (which became the Audubon Society of Portland in 1968).

In 1907, Finley published American Birds, which he and Herman T. Bohlman illustrated.  In 1910 he was appointed to study fish and game commissions in other states, and in 1911, based on his information one was set up in Oregon.

In 1925, Finley was appointed by the Oregon Governor Walter M. Pierce to the State Game Commission.

He died on June 29, 1953 in Portland, Oregon.

References

External links
American Birds from Google Books
Selected images from American Birds from the Oregon State University Archives Flickr page
William L. Finley Manuscript Collection at the Oregon State University Archives

1876 births
1953 deaths
Activists from California
American animal welfare workers
American conservationists
Nature photographers
Photographers from California
Photographers from Oregon